Agios Dimitrios Piliou is a village and a community in the municipality of Zagora-Mouresi, in the eastern part of Magnesia, Greece. Its population in 2011 was 243 for the village and 422 for the community, which includes the village of Agios Ioannis.

Agios Dimitrios is located on the eastern slope of the densely forested Pelion mountains, at about 170 meters elevation. It is 1 km southwest of the village Agios Ioannis, which is on the Aegean Sea coast. It is 1.5 km southeast of Anilio, 2 km northwest of Mouresi, 5 km southeast of Zagora and 19 km east of the city of Volos (Magnesia's capital).

Population

External links
Agios Dimitrios Piliou on GTP Travel Pages (in English and Greek)

References

Populated places in Pelion